Al Holcomb (born October 22, 1970) is an American football coach who is the senior defensive assistant for the Buffalo Bills of the National Football League (NFL). He previously served as the interim defensive coordinator for the Carolina Panthers and as an assistant coach for the Cleveland Browns, Arizona Cardinals and New York Giants.

Early career
Holcomb started his coaching career as a graduate assistant at Temple from 1995–96, helping with linebackers. He worked as linebackers coach, assistant track coach and physical education instructor at Colby College in 1997.

He spent six years from 1998-2003 at Bloomsburg University as linebackers coach and special teams coordinator. From 2004–05, Holcomb coached at Kutztown University, where he was the defensive coordinator and defensive backs coach in addition to being the interim head coach in the winter of 2005.

He oversaw the defensive line at Lafayette from 2006-08. Under Holcomb's tutelage, five different defensive linemen claimed All-Patriot League honors. During his final season in 2008, the Leopards led the conference in several defensive categories, including total defense and scoring defense. In his first season in 2006, Holcomb contributed to a unit that finished first in the Football Championship Subdivision in total defense, fourth in rushing defense and eighth in scoring defense.

Coaching career

New York Giants
In 2009, he joined the New York Giants as the defensive quality control coach.  In 2011, he was promoted to defensive assistant to Perry Fewell.  He won a Super Bowl ring with the Giants in Super Bowl XLVI.

Carolina Panthers
On January 26, 2013, he was hired as the linebackers coach for the Carolina Panthers. He was Pro Football Focus's first runner-up to their Linebackers Coach of the Year award.

In the 2015 season, Holcomb and the Panthers reached Super Bowl 50 on February 7, 2016. The Panthers fell to the Denver Broncos by a score of 24–10.

Arizona Cardinals
On January 26, 2018, Holcomb was hired as defensive coordinator for the Arizona Cardinals. He was fired on December 31, 2018, along with head coach Steve Wilks.

Cleveland Browns
On January 16, 2019, Holcomb was hired as linebackers coach and run game coordinator by the Cleveland Browns.

Carolina Panthers (second stint)
On January 19, 2020, Holcomb returned to the Carolina Panthers and was hired as their defensive run game coordinator.

The Panthers were selected to coach in the 2021 Senior Bowl, but linebackers coach Mike Siravo missed the game due to COVID-19 protocols, so Holcomb took over his duties in the game.

References

External links
Giants.com page
Panthers.com

New York Giants coaches
National Football League defensive coordinators
Temple Owls football coaches
Colby Mules football coaches
Bloomsburg Huskies football coaches
Kutztown Golden Bears football coaches
Lafayette Leopards football coaches
Carolina Panthers coaches
Arizona Cardinals coaches
1970 births
Living people
Cleveland Browns coaches